Stenanthemum pumilum is a species of flowering plant in the family Rhamnaceae and is endemic to the southwest of Western Australia. It is a low, compact shrub with hairy young stems, egg-shaped leaves, sometimes with the narrower end towards the base, and clusters of 10 to 30 white to creamy-white, woolly hairy, tube-shaped flowers.

Description
The lower surface of the leaves is densely covered with soft hairs pressed against the surface.

Taxonomy and naming
This species was first formally described in 1875 by Ferdinand von Mueller who gave it the name Spyridium pumilum in Fragmenta Phytographiae Australiae from specimens he collected in the Stirling Range. In 1904, Ludwig Diels changed the name to Stenanthemum pumilum in the journal Botanische Jahrbücher für Systematik, Pflanzengeschichte und Pflanzengeographie. The specific epithet (pumilum) means "diminutive" or "little".

In 2007, Barbara Lynette Rye described two subspecies of S. pumilum, and the names are accepted by the Australian Plant Census:
Flowering occurs from September to December.
 Stenanthemum pumilum (F.Muell.) Flowering occurs in September and October.

Distribution and habitat
Stenanthemum pumilum subsp. majas grows with Allocasuarina and Eucalyptus species, often in gravelly laterite or on granite outcrops, between the Brookton Highway and Highbury in the Avon Wheatbelt and Jarrah Forest bioregions of south-western Western Australia. Subspecies pumilum mostly grows in low heath and is restricted to the eastern half of the Stirling Range in the Esperance Plains bioregion.

Conservation status
Subspecies majus is listed as "not threatened" by the Western Australian Government Department of Biodiversity, Conservation and Attractions, but subsp. pumilum is listed as "Priority Three", meaning that it is poorly known and known from only a few locations but is not under imminent threat.

References

pumilum
Rosales of Australia
Flora of Western Australia
Plants described in 1875
Taxa named by Ferdinand von Mueller